Infanta, officially the Municipality of Infanta (Ilocano: Ili ti Infanta),  is a 1st class municipality in the province of Quezon, Philippines. According to the 2020 census, it has a population of 76,186 people.

Infanta is the largest lambanog manufacturer in the province of Quezon. The town is also known for its bayugo (giant mountain snail) dishes. The town is currently undergoing preparations for establishing a bayugo breeding center that would supply bayugo to townsfolk. The move is intended to stop the decline of bayugo in the wild. Also it is the center of economic activity in the northern part of Quezon. The Infanta town fiesta is celebrated every April 25. Infanta is also known as the "Gateway to the Pacific".

Geography 
It is accessible to Metro Manila through the Marcos Highway.

Barangays
Infanta is politically subdivided into 36 barangays: 7 urban and 29 rural.

Urban
 Poblacion 1
 Poblacion 38
 Poblacion 39
 Poblacion Bantilan
 Comon
 Ingas
 Dinahican

Rural

 Alitas
 Langgas
 Anibong
 Balobo
 Bacong
 Magsaysay
 Amolongin
 Pulo
 Binonoan
 Gumian
 Tongohin
 Pinaglapatan
 Ilog
 Catambungan
 Pilaway
 Agos Agos
 Banugao
 Miswa
 Lual
 Batican
 Boboin
 Libjo
 Abiawin
 Binulasan
 Maypulot
 Silangan
 Cawaynin
 Antikin
 Tudturan

Climate

History
Before the Spanish colonization, this place was known as Binangonan by its first peoples, the Dumagats. Binangonan is a Dumagat word pertaining to a sacred place where a bangon ("sacred name") was given by the Sobkal (Bobo a Laki) to an infant.

District of Infanta

(Translated from: Fray Felix de Huerta's “Estado, Topográfico, Estadistíco, Histórico—Religioso, de la Santa y Apostólica Provincia de San Gregorio Magno, de Religiosos Menores Descalzos de la Regular y Mas Estrecha Observancia De Nuestro Padre San Francisco, en las Islas Filipinas”. Binondo: 1865, by Dominador N. Marcaida Jr. (Accessed September 21, 2015 @http://bdh-rd.bne.es).

By decree of the Superior Government granted in the year of 1856, this district was created, with the territory that belonged to the province of the Laguna before; from 14° 30' up to the 15° 10' north latitude, including the island of Polillo and other small islands surrounding this. It is bordered on the North by the district of the Principe, on the East by the sea, on the South by the province of Tayabas, and on the West by that of the lake. It is flat land for the most part, has abundant pasture for cattle and horses, great hunting, fishing, wax and multitude of root crops, with an abundance of wood which are good for construction and cabinetry. The capital is located in Binangonan, where the politico-military Governor is located. Its natives were converted by our religious, who founded and managed the following towns:

Binangonan de Lampon
In the year 1578, the venerable and zealous Fray Esteban Ortíz planted the consoling sign of the Cross in this town, who toured the east coast of the island in an expanse of more than sixty leagues, while the shortage of missionaries at that time did not allow the continued assistance of a minister until the year of 1609, with the holy martyr Fray Blas Palomino undertaking anew its conversion, formalized this town and was its first minister.

After the years of 1658, the administration of this town was ceded from this apostolic province of St. Gregory to the Augustinian Recollects and they abdicated also in the year 1703, returning it to our charge and numbered then of not more than ninety tributes.

It is located in the 14° 49' Í0" latitude in a flat land, on the eastern coast of the island and on the right of the river named Agos, which has its origin from the grand cordillera mountains on the Northern part of Luzon island and which river, running from West to East, empties into the sea in front the island of Polillo. It is bordered on the North by the town of Baler, distant about twenty and seven leguas: on the East by the island and town of Polillo, an eight-hour time of navigation on fair weather; on the South by the town of Mauban, belonging to the province of Tayabas and as about fifteen leguas, and West-Southwest by the town of Siniloan at eight leguas, which crosses the mountains above.

It enjoys a temperate and healthy climate in a well-ventilated area.The most common diseases are hot fevers and tuberculosis. It is supplied with waters from the river and several springs, all of good quality. It does not have more roads than the very difficult path through the mount, which leads to the town of Siniloan. To connect with the town of Mauban, it must be done by water, and the navigations are very dangerous, or almost impossible from the months of October up to March, and to connect with the town of Baler, in addition to the aforementioned difficulty in navigation, cannot be taken by land throughout the coast for fear of the many infidels that inhabit the area. The mail is received from the capital of the province when there is opportunity.

The Church, dedicated to the Evangelist San Marcos, was of bamboo cane and nipa until the year 1732, by which time it was burnt down and the existing one was built, which is made of stone, but roofed with nipa, and the same as the parish house, which serves as a tribunal. There is a school of primary education, endowed by the funds of the community; about six hundred wooden houses and many others from bamboo, distributed in its twenty-eight barrios, some of them quite far from the Church. It is currently served by Fray Lucas Martínez, Preacher of 29 years of age.

State Of The Parish
This village has no limits. In their lengthy and lush forests are all kinds of woods for construction and cabinetry, of the best quality: many and good pastures for cattle and horses; variety of palms, canes and reeds, with plenty of fruit and rootcrops: abundant hunting buffalo, boar, deer and fowl, with much wax and honey. There is also a quarry of granite stone, discovered the year of 1849 by Fray Antonio del Moral. A little distant from the town exists a safe harbor for ships of high board, but its entry is dangerous to the inexperienced, and from October to March is risky to navigate the coast because of the strong northerly winds that blow. The land reduced to cultivation produces abundant crops of rice, maize, sugarcane, cocoa, coffee and sweet potato. The abaca was planted for the first time in the year 1851 by Fray Antonio del Moral, and gave so happy results that today that its increasing cultivation is continued with large activity and benefit. Its natives are engaged in agriculture, the harvest of the abaca, the nipa wine, whose palm abounds in its land; the breeding of cattle, in the hunting and fishing, whose products, with the excess of other agricultural products, is exported in medium-sized boats to the town of Mauban, in the province of Tayabas and to the towns of Paracale and Mambulao, returning gold dust after being brought to the Capital.

Below are the Religious Franciscans ministered in Binangonan de Lampon after Fray Ortíz and Fray Palomino:

Franciscan Friars (1617 to 1880s), Binangonan de Lampon

Source: Eusebio Gómez Platero's “Catálogo Biográfico de los Religiosos Franciscanos de la Provincia de San Gregorio Magno de Filipinas desde 1577 en que Llegaron las Primeros hasta las de nuestras Dias” Manila Press of Royal College of Sto. Tomás, under the charge of Don Geryasio Memije, 1880 (http://bdh-rd.bne.es) translated by Dominador N. Marcaida Jr.

Legend
According to the legend, the people who established the first settlement in the land that became Infanta were led by an elder named Nunong Karugtong. These settlers crossed the Sierra Madre Mountains from somewhere in what is now Rizal Province in search of better living conditions. After examining multiple sites, they eventually settled on a site near the Bantilan River, where the discovery of a huge Yam root convinced them that the site was ideal for settlement. This eventually became the site of the settlement which European colonizers would call Binangonan de Lampon which in turn would eventually become the Municipality of Infanta.

Spanish Colonial Era 
In 1578, more than half a century after Ferdinand Magellan and his men landed in Cebu and thirteen years after Miguel López de Legazpi founded the first Spanish settlement also in Cebu, a Spanish priest named Esteban Ortíz arrived in Binangonan de Lampon and planted a wooden cross symbolizing the introduction of Spanish colonial rule at the place. In 1696, Don Diego Mangilaya, a native chieftain developed the settlement into a community and built a wooden chapel at the spot where Nunong Karugtong fell asleep. Since its establishment, the area has been attacked by Moro pirates, and visited by typhoons and cholera epidemics as recent as 2004. In 1803, Captain Pedro de León affiliated Binangonan de Lampon to the province of Nueva Ecija and in 1850, Kapitan Rafael Orozco withdrew Infanta from the province of Nueva Ecija and joined it with the province of Laguna to the west. In 1835, Binangonan de Lampon was renamed "Infanta" by Captain Juan Salvador in honor of the saint Jesus Infante (Child Jesus). All the inhabitants of Infanta were given Spanish surnames pursuant to a Royal Decree of November 11, 1848.

Philippine Revolution 
On July 20, 1898, a group of Infanta Katipuneros headed by Colonel Pablo Astilla attacked the Spanish forces holed up at the limestone convent and after several days of siege and fighting, the Spanish soldiers surrendered.

American Colonial Era 
By virtue of the December 10, 1898 Paris Treaty of Peace, American soldiers occupied the town of Infanta and appointed Kapitan Carlos Ruidera Azcárraga as the first "town presidente." He was followed by Rufino Ortíz in 1903 who withdrew Infanta from the province of Laguna and joined it to the province of Tayabas. He also ordered the planting of coconut trees in the barrios (now barangays) of Infanta. During the administration of town "presidente" Gregorio Rutaquio (1911–1916), he constructed the "Gabaldón type" of school house. In 1917-1919, Don Agustin Pumarada served as the town president, he belonged to the Pumarada Political Clan of Polillo. From 1923 to 1928, Don Florencio Potes became town "presidente". He constructed the concrete municipal building and the first telegraph office of the town. From 1935 to 1939, Mr. Fabián Sollesa served as town "presidente". During his incumbency, the Infanta-Famy Road traversing the Sierra Madre from Infanta to Laguna and Rizal provinces was constructed. Also, piped water from a spring reservoir in barrio (barangay) Gumian was installed.

World War II 
In December 1941 the Japanese Imperial forces occupied the town of Infanta. On May 25, 1945, the liberation by combined Filipino and American soldiers entered in the town was supported by the guerrilla fighters fought the Japanese Imperial forces until the end of World War II.

Contemporary history 
On July 21, 1949, General Nakar was created from the municipality. In 1950, the municipality was made the seat of the Roman Catholic Territorial Prelature of Infanta.

Infanta was partitioned once again as the municipal district of Real became a municipality on December 15, 1960.

Demographics

Economy

Education

Infanta is the center of educative learning, with four colleges that attract many students to study from nearby towns of Real, General Nakar, Polillo, Panukulan, Burdeos, Patnanungan and Jomalig. Here are the colleges in Infanta:
Northern Quezon College, Inc.
Southern Luzon State University-Infanta Campus
Rizal Marine Technological College
ACTS Computer College

Secondary schools:
Infanta National High School (largest Public High School in Infanta)
Mount Carmel School of Infanta (largest and only Catholic School in Infanta)
Binulasan Integrated School
Tongohin National High School
Langgas National High School
Little Friends of Jesus Corner Stone Academy of Infanta

Town's Hymn
The Hymn of the Town of Infanta is entitled "Mabuhay Ka Infanta" written by the alumni of Mount Carmel School of Infanta.

References

External links

[ Philippine Standard Geographic Code]
Philippine Census Information
Local Governance Performance Management System 

Municipalities of Quezon
Populated places established in 1578
Port cities and towns in the Philippines